Yiğit Kirazcı (born 17 August 1983) is a Turkish actor.

Filmography

References 

1983 births
Living people
Turkish male film actors
Turkish male television actors
Male actors from Istanbul